Similar Skin is the eighth studio album by American rock band Umphrey's McGee. It was released on June 10, 2014.

Umphrey's McGee recorded Similar Skin at IV Lab Studios in Chicago, Illinois, and it was the first album on the band's label, Nothing Too Fancy Music. AllMusic says of the album's content: "While still entrenched in the wandering spirit of jam band improvisation, the 11 songs lean heavily on the influence of '80s pop, rock, and even radio metal …"

Track listing 

Total Running Time: 54:18

Bonus tracks

References

External links
 Album website
 iTunes preview

Umphrey's McGee albums
2014 albums